The Healing Component is the debut studio album by American rapper Mick Jenkins. It was released on September 23, 2016, by Cinematic Music Group.

Background
The album's production came from multiple contributors such as Rascal, THEMpeople, Sango, Atu, Dee Lilly, BadBadNotGood, Kaytranada, IAMNOBODI, Monte Booker, Cam O'bi and Dpat. The album features guest appearances, which includes his longtime contributors The Mind and Noname, as well as BadBadNotGood, Ravyn Lenae, J-Stock, Xavier Omar and Michael Anthony.

Singles
On August 17, 2016, Mick Jenkins released "Spread Love" as the album's lead single. On August 25, 2016, he released the album's second single, "Drowning", accompanied by a music video.

Critical reception

The Healing Component received generally positive reviews from music critics upon release. On Metacritic, the album has a weighted average score of 79 out of 100, based on seven critics, indicating "generally favorable reviews".

Track listing

Charts

References

2016 debut albums
Mick Jenkins (rapper) albums
Cinematic Music Group albums
Albums produced by Kaytranada
Albums produced by BadBadNotGood